I ♥ Marvel (aka I Heart Marvel or I Love Marvel and commonly stylized as I (heart) Marvel) was a series of connected one-shots published by Marvel Comics around February 2006 (although cover-dated April 2006) to coincide with the romance-themed holiday of Valentine's Day.

The series told several romantic stories featuring characters from the Marvel comics universe, with each issue focusing on a different area of the Marvel universe (X-Men, supervillains, etc.).

Despite appearing to be a typical fifth-week event comic, February 2006, like every February (excepting leap years), had only four weeks.

Issues

My Mutant Heart
My Mutant Heart was the first one-shot published and was an X-Men-centric issue. The issue included the following stories:
The Promise - A Wolverine story written by Daniel Way and with art by Ken Knutsden. Wolverine recalls an affair that he had in Berlin in 1943.
How Love Works - A Doop story written by Peter Milligan with art by Marcos Martin. A private investigator follows a woman who is having an affair with Doop.
My Girlfriend, The Thief! - A story about Cannonball written and drawn by Tim Fish.

Web of Romance
This second issue focuses on Spider-Man as he tries to think of a gift to give to Mary Jane Watson for Valentine's Day. The story was written by Tom Beland and with art by Cory Walker and Cliff Rathburn.

Marvel Ai
Marvel Ai (subtitled Ai = Love or Ai is Japanese for Love) was the third issue and featured various Marvel heroes and manga-inspired art. The stories included were all written by C. B. Cebulski and were as follows:
Meld With You - (Art by Tomoko Taniguchi) The Scarlet Witch recalls her date with The Vision.
The Silence of the Heart - (Art by Kei Kobayashi) Medusa contemplates her relationship with Black Bolt.
Love is Blindness - (Art by Toga) A story without speech in which the Black Widow and Elektra fight over Daredevil.

Outlaw Love
Written by Fabian Nicieza and with art by Jon Proctor, this issue focuses on the relationship between supervillains the Answer and Ruby Thursday. Bullseye also appears, as do the Sisters of Sin (Torso, Slash, Hoodwink, and Raunch) in a cameo.

Masked Intentions
Fabian Nicieza wrote this issue which presents two different stories of young superheroes in love.
First Kiss - (Art by Paco Medina) Squirrel Girl is infatuated with Speedball.
Last Date - (Art by Mike Norton) Justice and Firestar of the New Warriors prepare for their wedding, but Firestar has cold feet.

2006 comics debuts
Marvel Comics titles
One-shot comic titles
Romance comics